Acting Very Strange is the second and final solo album by Genesis guitarist/bassist Mike Rutherford and the only album to feature him on lead vocals. It was released on 7 September 1982. Unlike the previous album Smallcreep's Day, Acting Very Strange uses a very raw and unpolished sound. None of the album's singles charted in the US or UK top 100, but the lead single "Maxine" did make US Billboard charts Mainstream Rock Tracks Chart at No. 37. The song was also a top 40 pop hit in Canada, peaking at No. 39. The album itself was much more successful, reaching number 23 in the UK.

History
Rutherford opted to do the lead vocals on the album himself, simply because, in his words, "It does feel odd when someone does... a solo album and they don't sing, because the voice is so much the character of a song. So I thought, 'What the hell? I'm gonna give it a shot.'" However, this proved to be easier said than done; he recounted that recording the backing tracks for the album was very easy and enjoyable, but that the vocals were "hard work".

Stewart Copeland of The Police was notably invited to play drums on the record - specifically two of the songs according to a September 1982 newsletter from The Police’s official fan club (without specifying which songs). Drumming duties for remaining tracks with real drums were handled by Pete Phipps.  The Linn drum machine is also credited individually for providing some of the drum tracks.

Looking back on Acting Very Strange in later years, Rutherford was not proud of the album, saying he felt that the songs were very good but poorly executed on the actual recordings. He singled out "Hideaway" as the only track which he felt worked. Dissatisfied with his solo work (and with his vocals in particular), Rutherford curtailed his solo career to form Mike + The Mechanics. (However, Rutherford did sing lead on one more solo track, "Making a Big Mistake", which appears on the soundtrack to "Against All Odds".)

"Halfway There", "I Don't Wanna Know" and "Maxine" were performed live on Mike + The Mechanics' first tour in 1986, with Paul Young singing lead vocals on all three songs.

Reception

In their retrospective review, Allmusic said that most of the songs were weak, and that even the few good ones would have been better had Rutherford not done the lead vocals himself: "There's no denying his sincerity, but he should let his fingers do the talking."

Track listing

Non-album tracks
Another song recorded during the album sessions, "Calypso", was released as the B-side to the single "Hideaway". Remixes of "Acting Very Strange" and "Couldn't Get Arrested" were featured on a 12" single and also used as B-sides for "Acting Very Strange".

Personnel 
 Mike Rutherford – lead and backing vocals, keyboards, guitars, bass, Linn programming
 Paul Fishman – keyboards
 J. Peter Robinson – keyboards
 John Alexander – guitars 
 Daryl Stuermer – guitars
 Stewart Copeland – drums
 Pete Phipps – drums
 Gary Barnacle – saxophones
 Luke Tunney – trumpet
 Martyn Ford – string arrangements and conductor
 Steve Gould – backing vocals
 Noel McCalla – backing vocals
 Dale Newman – backing vocals

Production 
 Producer – Mike Rutherford
 Assistant Producer and Engineer – Nick Launay
 Assistant Engineer – Geoff Callingham
 Recorded at The Farm (Surrey, UK), The Town House (London, UK) and Manor Mobile (Oxfordshire, UK).
 Equipment – Dale Newman, Geoff Callingham, Steve Jones and Geoff Banks.
 Tape Operator – Howard Gray
 Cover Coordinator – Bill Smith
 Photography – Gered Mankowitz
 Management – Tony Smith and Carol Willis at Hit & Run Music.

Charts

References 

Mike Rutherford albums
1982 albums
Albums produced by Mike Rutherford